Stephen Oduro (born 13 April 1983) is a professional footballer, who plays as a midfielder for Asante Kotoko.

Career
Oduro nicknamed "Yaw Zico or Tico Tico" because of his height, began his career with Real Tamale United and was transferred in 2000 to Asante Kotoko. He has been an instrumental part to porcupine warriors since his arrival from the north giants. Asante Kotoko fans also call him the darling boy. Oduro is also one of Ghana-based freekick expert and  he scored a brilliant one against rivals Hearts of Oak in a 2–0 win at the Kumasi Sports Stadium.

International
He is also former Black Stars member and holds one cap and was member Black Starlets squad for the 1999 FIFA U-17 World Championship in New Zealand.

References

External links
 

1983 births
Living people
Ghanaian footballers
Ghana international footballers
Association football midfielders
Asante Kotoko S.C. players
Real Tamale United players
People from Tamale, Ghana